Gayle is a settlement in Jamaica. 

Gayle had a population of 3,238 as of 2009.

References

Populated places in Saint Mary Parish, Jamaica